Saint-Germain, Saint Germain or Saint Germaine may refer to:

Places 

 List of French communes named Saint-Germain
 Saint-Germain, Quebec, Canada
 Saint-Germain River, Quebec, Canada
 St. Germain, Wisconsin, U.S.
 St. Germain (community), Wisconsin

People 

 Antoine-Louis Decrest de Saint-Germain (1761–1835), French Count and general
 Christopher St. Germain (1460–1540), English legal writer
 Claude Louis, Comte de Saint-Germain (1707–1778), French general
 Count of St. Germain (c. 1691 or 1712 – 1784), European adventurer and scientist
 St. Germain (Theosophy), a legendary spiritual master, identified with Count of St. Germain
 Jacques St. Germain, a legendary vampire of New Orleans folklore, identified with Count of St. Germain
 Fernand St. Germain (1928–2014), American politician
 Germain of Paris (496–576), bishop and saint
 Germaine Cousin (1579–1601), French saint
 Germanus of Auxerre (c. 378–448) (Saint Germain l'Auxerrois),  bishop and saint
 Gerry St. Germain (born 1937), Canadian politician
 Henri de Saint Germain (1878–1951), French fencer
 Karen St. Germain (born c. 1957), American politician; see Louisiana Center for Women in Government and Business Hall of Fame, 2017
 Kip St. Germaine (born 1965), American ice sledge hockey player
 Laurence St. Germain (born 1994), Canadian ski racer
 Ludwig-Friedrich Bonnet de Saint-Germain (1670–1761), Swiss scholar and politician
 Mark St. Germain, (born ca. 1954) American playwright, author, and film and television writer.
 Nikarson Saint-Germain (born 1978), known as Alibi Montana, French rapper
 Noël Saint-Germain (1922–1998), Canadian politician
 Omer St. Germain (1877–1949), Canadian lawyer and politician
 Ralph St. Germain (1904–1974), Canadian ice hockey player
 Ray St. Germain (born 1940), Canadian musician and author
 Raymonde Saint-Germain (born 1951), Canadian public servant
 Ron Saint Germain, (born ca. 1946), American record producer
 Saint-Germain (actor) (François Victor Arthur Gilles de Saint-Germain, 1832–1899), French actor
 Sheryl St. Germain (born 1954), American writer professor
 St Germain (musician) Ludovic Navarre, (born 1969), French musician
 Tabitha St. Germain (fl. from 1985), Canadian actress
 Ted St. Germaine (1885–1947), American football player
 Val St. Germain (born 1971), Canadian footballer

Arts and entertainment

Fictional characters 

 Count of St. Germain in The Secrets of the Immortal Nicholas Flamel series
 Count Saint-Germain, a character in novels by Chelsea Quinn Yarbro
 Maya St. Germain, in the Pretty Little Liars book series
 Saint-Germain, in Symphogear
 Serena St. Germaine, in James Bond 007: Everything or Nothing

Other uses in arts and entertainment 

 Saint Germaine (comics), by Gary Reed
 St Germain (album), by French house musician Ludovic Navarre as St Germain, 2015
 St. Germaine mystery book series by classical musician Mark Schweizer

Other uses 

 , the name of several French ships
 Saint Germain Bakery, a Canadian brand of Fairchild Group
 Saint Germain Foundation, an American religious organization
 Saint Germain HC, a French hockey club
 St-Germain (liqueur), an elderflower liqueur
 St. Germain High School, in Bangalore, India

See also 

 
 
 
 
 
 Germanus (disambiguation)
 Germain (disambiguation)
 Paris Saint-Germain F.C., a French football club